1748 Mauderli, provisional designation , is a dark and very reddish Hildian asteroid from the outermost region of the asteroid belt, approximately 45 kilometers in diameter.

It was discovered on 7 September 1966, by astronomer Paul Wild at Zimmerwald Observatory near Bern, Switzerland, and was later named after Swiss astronomer Sigmund Mauderli.

Orbit and classification 

Mauderli is a member of the Hilda family of asteroids which stay in a 3:2 resonance with the gas giant Jupiter. Among the Hilda family, it is one of its members with the highest amplitude of libration relative to the stable periodic orbit.

The asteroid orbits the Sun in the outermost main-belt at a distance of 3.1–4.8 AU once every 7 years and 10 months (2,857 days). Its orbit has an eccentricity of 0.22 and an inclination of 3° with respect to the ecliptic.

Physical characteristics 

Mauderli a dark D-type asteroid in the Tholen classification. It is also the reddest among the known asteroids of this spectral type.

Three rotational lightcurves gave a concurring rotation period of 6.00 hours with a brightness variation between 0.10 and 0.12 magnitude.

Diameter and albedo 

Based on the space-based surveys carried out by the Japanese Akari satellite and NASA's Wide-field Infrared Survey Explorer with its subsequent NEOWISE missions, Mauderli measures 44.908 and 51.91 kilometers in diameter and has an albedo of 0.037 and 0.048, respectively. The Collaborative Asteroid Lightcurve Link assumes a standard albedo for carbonaceous asteroids of 0.057 and calculates a diameter of 40.32 kilometers with on an absolute magnitude of 10.7.

Naming 

This minor planet was named by the discoverer in honor of Sigmund Mauderli (1876–1962), Swiss astronomer and director of the Astronomical Institute at the University of Bern from 1921–1946. He devoted much of his time to orbit determination and perturbation computing of minor planets for the Astronomisches Rechen-Institut in Germany. The official  was published by the Minor Planet Center on 1 October 1969.

Notes

References

External links 
 Asteroid Lightcurve Database (LCDB), query form (info )
 Dictionary of Minor Planet Names, Google books
 Asteroids and comets rotation curves, CdR – Observatoire de Genève, Raoul Behrend
 Discovery Circumstances: Numbered Minor Planets (1)-(5000) – Minor Planet Center
 
 

001748
Discoveries by Paul Wild (Swiss astronomer)
Named minor planets
001748
19660907